CBET may refer to:

 CBET-DT, a CBC Television owned-and-operated station located in Windsor, Ontario
 Canada Bangladesh Education Trust
 Center for Bioscience Education & Technology of the Rochester Institute of Technology
 Central Bio Equipment Trading Company Limited (CBET), based in Myanmar
 Central Bureau Electronic Telegram, a circular issued by the IAU's Central Bureau for Astronomical Telegrams (CBAT)
 Certified Biomedical Equipment Technician
 Chemical, Bioengineering, Environmental, and Transport systems, a division of the National Science Foundation's Directorate for Engineering
 Community-Based English Tutoring program of California
 Competency-Based Education and Training
 Conrad Business, Entrepreneurship and Technology centre of the University of Waterloo